Endō, Endo, Endoh or Endou (written: , literally 'far-off wisteria' and short for 'Fujiwara in Enshu') is the 38th most common Japanese surname. Notable people with the surname include:
 , Japanese actress
 Akari Endo (born 1989), Dominican-Japanese actress
 , Japanese voice actor
 , Japanese footballer
 Akira Endo (disambiguation), multiple people
 , Japanese architect
 , Japanese voice actress
 , Japanese artist
 , Japanese baseball player
 , Japanese footballer
 Harry Endo (1922–2009), American actor
 , Japanese manga artist
 , Japanese badminton player
 , Japanese baseball player
 , Japanese women's footballer
 , Japanese footballer
 , Japanese actor
 , Japanese footballer
 , Japanese footballer
 , Japanese actor and writer
 Kenny Endo (born 1953), American taiko musician
 , Japanese statesman
 , Japanese rugby union player
 , Japanese idol and singer
 , Japanese tennis player
 , Japanese singer-songwriter
 , Japanese footballer
 , Japanese video game designer
 , Japanese actor
 , Japanese baseball player
 , Japanese musician
 , Japanese composer, music arranger and producer
 , Japanese voice actress
 , Japanese physicist and chemist
 , Japanese samurai
 , Japanese samurai
 Nic Endo (born 1976), Japanese-German-American noise musician
 , Japanese politician
 , Japanese politician
 , Japanese actress
 , Japanese baseball player
 , Japanese baseball player
 , Japanese cult member
 , Japanese aikidoka
 , Japanese sport wrestler
 , Japanese freestyle skier
 , Japanese sumo wrestler
 , member of the comedy duo Cocorico
  Japanese Roman Catholic writer
 , Japanese judoka
 Tadashi Endo (born 1947), Japanese butoh dancer
 , Japanese footballer
 , Japanese footballer
 , Japanese politician
 , Japanese motorcycle racer
 , Japanese actor
 , Japanese engineer
 Tetsuya Endo (disambiguation), multiple people
 Tomotaka Endo (born 1995), Japanese squash player
 , Japanese politician
 , Japanese footballer
 , Japanese long-distance runner
 , Japanese footballer
 , Japanese footballer
 , Japanese footballer
 , Japanese rower
 , Japanese rhythmic gymnast
 , Japanese artistic gymnast
 , Japanese voice actress and singer
 , Japanese actor and singer

References

Japanese-language surnames